Pareuthria atrata is a species of sea snail, a marine gastropod mollusk in the family Cominellidae.

Description 
Shell medium sized, up to 22 mm in height, fusiform, of six convex whorls; protoconch of 2 ½ convex whorls, translucent, smooth, transition to teleoconch well defined; suture impressed, aperture oval, labrum expanded, sharp, with a small, curved subsutural slit; siphonal canal short; parietal callus very thin; axial ornamentation of about 10 to 12 varices, complete in all whorls but the last, where they vanish below middle whorl; some specimens, only with weak varices on the early whorls; spiral ornamentation of about 15 characteristic, regularly spaced striae per whorl, 30 on the last; periostracum absent (?); color typically pinkish, reddish or dark purple, inside creamy white; operculum brown, ovate, nucleus subterminal. Radula rachiglossate, very similar to P. fuscata, but the cusps of the lateral teeth are more closely spaced in P. atrata, particularly in the juvenile specimens. Penis large, long, subrectangular, flat, generally similar to that of Pareuthria fuscata. Some minor differences are likely due to the reproductive stage and the reaction to critical point drying method.

Distribution 
Off Buenos Aires province to Ushuaia, Tierra del Fuego, Malvinas and Staten Island, Argentina in the Atlantic; Southern Chile, Punta Arenas, to Calbuco (41°S) in the Pacific Ocean.

References

 Hombron, J.B. & Jacquinot, C.H. (1842-1854). Atlas d'histoire Naturelle zoologie par MM. Hombron et Jacquinot, chirurgiens de l'expédition. Voyage au Pole Sud et dans l'Océanie sur les corvettes l'Astrolabe et la Zélée éxecuté par ordre du roi pendant les années 1837–1838–1839–1840 sous le commandement de M. Dumont-d'Urville, capitaine de vaisseau, publié sous les auspices du département de la marine et sous la direction supérieure de M. Jacquinot, capitaine de vaisseau, commandant de la Zélée. Zoologie. Gide & Cie, Paris.

External links
 Rochebrune A.-T. de & Mabille, J. (1889). Mollusques. in: Mission Scientifique du Cap Horn 1882-1883. Tome 6 (Zoologie 2, part 8). Paris, Gauthiers-Villars. H.1-H.129, pls. 1-8.
 Pastorino G. (2016). Revision of the genera Pareuthria Strebel, 1905, Glypteuthria Strebel, 1905 and Meteuthria Thiele, 1912 (Gastropoda: Buccinulidae) with the description of three new genera and two new species from Southwestern Atlantic waters. Zootaxa. 4179(3): 301-344

Cominellidae
Gastropods described in 1881